Team Colombia (Equipo Colombia) is a conservative political party in Colombia. 
At the last legislative elections, 10 March 2002, the party won, as one of the many small parties, parliamentary representation. It joined forces with ALAS, another small party, for the 2006 legislative election. In the election of 2006, the party won 7 out of 166 deputies and 5 out of 100 senators. The two political movements joined to form ALAS-Team Colombia.

External links
Official web site (Spanish)
Democracia a distancia: Elecciones 2006 (Portalcol.com) (Information about the party's list of candidates to the Colombian Senate, Spanish).

Conservative parties in Colombia